The ninth season of the animated comedy series Bob's Burgers began airing on Fox in the United States on September 30, 2018, and concluded on May 12, 2019.

Episodes

References

External links
 Official website
 
 

2018 American television seasons
2019 American television seasons
Bob's Burgers seasons